George Percival Norman Watt  (2 June 189021 July 1983) was a senior Australian public servant and company director. He was Secretary of the Department of the Treasury between November 1948 and March 1951.

Life and career
George Watt was born in Hawthorn, Melbourne on 2 June 1890. He was schooled at Auburn State School and Wesley College.

He joined the Australian Public Service in the Department of Defence in 1908. During World War II, he was transferred on a temporary basis to the Department of the Treasury, serving as the head of the defence division in Melbourne. He became the Secretary of the Treasury in November 1948, after having acted in the role since February 1948.

In March 1951 Watt retired from his Secretary role to become chairman of the National Airlines Commission.

Watt died on 21 July 1983, aged 93.

Awards
Watt was made a Commander of the Order of the British Empire in June 1951. He was appointed a Companion of the Order of St Michael and St George in June 1957 for services to civil aviation in Australia.

References

1890 births
1983 deaths
Australian Commanders of the Order of the British Empire
Australian Companions of the Order of St Michael and St George
Secretaries of the Department of the Treasury of Australia
People from Hawthorn, Victoria
Public servants from Melbourne
Businesspeople from Melbourne